Le Cock Sportif is the debut studio album by the rap rock group Brougham. The album spawned one single, "Murked Out." A music video, directed by Chris Cuffaro, was released. The cover and album artwork featured porn stars Raylene and Dasha, who also appeared in the "Murked Out" video.

Spin Magazine named the album title the "worst rap-rock album title" ever.

Background & recording
Initially formed in 1997 by Jason Slater (from Third Eye Blind) and Luke Oakson, Brougham had been working on material for a couple of years prior to the recording of "Le Cock Sportif." Slater and Oakson were the predominant musicians involved in recording the album, though the two recruited additional musicians for some of the songs, similar to how Slater operated Snake River Conspiracy. Slater left to tour with Snake River Conspiracy, but Oakson remained and toured as Brougham briefly, before the group disbanded completely in late 2000.

Critical reception
Despite its commercial failure, the album was well-received by music critics. AllMusic's review, penned by Steve Huey, commented that the music has "an upbeat, sunny feel reminiscent of sample-based hits by Smash Mouth or L.E.N., albeit with a hardcore rap edge," awarding the album 4 out of 5 stars. HipOnline's review by Rae Gun was similarly positive, calling the album "an acquired taste," likening the group's music to that of Kid Rock. Robert Christgau was less enthusiastic about the album, giving the album 2 stars and noting "Don't Speak English" and "Bong Hits" as the highlights.

Track listing

Personnel
Personnel per liner notes.

Brougham
 Jason Slater - production (all), song writing, instrumentation, engineering
 Luke Oakson - vocals, rapping, lyrics
Production
Joe Barresi - producer (5), engineer
David Kahne - producer (2, 3, 6, 9)
Tony Fredianelli - songwriting (on Sangria)
Art
Neil Kellerhouse - art direction
Chris Cuffaro - photography

References

External links
 Video for "Murked Out" on Chris Cuffaro's website

2000 debut albums
Brougham (band) albums
Albums produced by David Kahne
Albums produced by Jason Slater